Amitabh Bhattacharjee (born 15 August 1973) is an Indian actor who works in Bengali and Hindi films. He was born and brought up in Delhi. His Bengali debut film was Rasta, directed by Bratya Basu, with Mithun Chakraborty. He has done many Bengali films & Hindi films as well. Apart from this, he was seen in a Bengali show named Checkmate and he portrayed the character of Dr. Subhankar Banerjee, the male protagonist of Bikele Bhorer Phool.

Filmography

Hindi
The Legend of Bhagat Singh (2002)
Saanjh (2004)
Kalyug (2005)

Bengali

 Rasta 2003
 Swapne Dekha Rajkanya 2004
 Shakti 2004
 Akritagno 2004
 Shikar 2006
 Je Jon Thake Majhkhane 2006
 Abhinetri 2006
 Tulkalam 2007
 Shudhu Tomar Jonyo 2007
 Tumi Kar 2008
 Tollywood Focus 2008
 Sedin Dujone 2008
 Rangamati 2008
 Hello Kolkata 2008
 Jhar Sheshe (unreleased) 2008
 Eka Eka (unreleased) 2008
 Baghini Kanya (unreleased) 2008
 Ami, Yasin Ar Amar Madhubala 2008
 Risk 2009
 Murder 2011
 Kolkata The Metro Life 2011
 Jibone Prem Ekbar Ashe 2013
 Bindaas 2014
 Prem Juddho 2015
 Jhooth Bole Kauwa Kaate 2016
 Game Plan 2016
 Kanamachi Bho Bho 2016
 Raktokarobi 2017
 Ekdin Ratre 2018
 Raghav 2018
 Nolok 2018
 Chobiyal 2020

Television

References

External links
 

Living people
Male actors in Bengali cinema
Male actors in Hindi cinema
1973 births
Indian male film actors
21st-century Indian male actors